Thomas Joseph Firbank (13 June 1910 – 1 December 2000) was a Canadian/Welsh author, farmer, soldier and engineer.

He was born in Quebec, Canada, to an English father and a Welsh mother. His parents were Hubert Somerset Firbank, a railway contractor born in 1887 in Chislehurst, Kent (to Sir Joseph Thomas Firbank) and Gwendoline Louise Lewis (who were married in 1909 in Dolgellau, Merionethshire, Wales). Following his father's early death, he was raised among his mother's hill-farming community in the Berwyn Mountains of North Wales. He was educated at Stowe School.

His first book, an autobiography entitled I Bought a Mountain was published in 1940 and became a major international best-seller. It describes how aged only 21, he bought Dyffryn Mymbyr farm, a  sheep farm in Capel Curig, North Wales, in 1931 and painstakingly learned his trade, while portraying the beauty of Snowdonia. Firbank was a keen mountain walker, and the book includes a hair-raising account of how he and his two companions were possibly the first to ascend all of the Welsh 3000s in less than 9 hours. Firbank's first wife, Esme Cummins, a Surrey-born actress whom he met in 1933, features prominently.

The book ends with pastoral calm interrupted by the ominous drumbeats of the Second World War which drew Thomas Firbank away from his beloved farm to enlist in the Coldstream Guards. He was later seconded to the newly formed Airborne Forces with whom he fought in North Africa, Italy and Arnhem, and was awarded the Military Cross. At the end of the war, as Lieutenant-Colonel, he commanded the Airborne Forces Depot on the Isle of Wight. His book I Bought a Star, (pub. 1951) describes his war-time experiences with the 1st Airborne Division.

His marriage ended during the Second World War, both parties finding new partners. In difficult postwar circumstances, he generously gave Esme his farm in 1947, enabling her to remain there with her new partner. In 1967 she became an important founder member of the Snowdonia Society: see obituary. After her death the farm was donated to the National Trust.

Log Hut (pub. George G. Harrap, 1954) details his experiences in a bungalow on the north east edge of Dartmoor.

A Country of Memorable Honour (pub. 1953) describes a walking tour through Wales with fascinating characters at every turn. This tour was a farewell to the old country before moving to Japan to open up the Far East for a British engineering firm.

A novel entitled Bride to the Mountain (pub. Harrap 1940, reprinted C. Chivers Dec. 1965, then again by Portway Reprints under ) was written shortly after the success of I Bought A Mountain and draws heavily on the same experiences. It also appears to be largely based on an actual 1927 case when a strong but insane climber called Giveen caused the deaths of two others.

He returned to Snowdonia in 1993, and lived at Elen's Castle Hotel in Dolwyddelan for some time and wrote further articles on conservation. He died in December 2000 in Llanrwst, Conwy, North Wales

References

See also 
Obituary

Canadian memoirists
1910 births
2000 deaths
Coldstream Guards officers
British Parachute Regiment officers
People educated at Stowe School
Recipients of the Military Cross
20th-century memoirists
Canadian military personnel from Quebec
Canadian emigrants to the United Kingdom